This is a list of members of the 5th Bundestag – the lower house of parliament of the Federal Republic of Germany, whose members were in office from 1965 until 1969.



Summary 
This summary includes changes in the numbers of the three caucuses (CDU/CSU, SPD, FDP):

Members

A 
 Manfred Abelein, CDU
 Ernst Achenbach, FDP
 Rudi Adams, SPD (from 8 December 1966)
 Konrad Adenauer, CDU (until 19 April 1967)
 Eduard Adorno, CDU
 Hermann Ahrens, SPD (GDP)
 Heinrich Aigner, CSU
 Luise Albertz, SPD
 Walter Althammer, CSU
 Hans Apel, SPD
 Walter Arendt, SPD
 Claus Arndt, SPD (from 4 June 1968)
 Klaus Dieter Arndt, SPD
 Adolf Arndt, SPD
 Gottfried Arnold, CDU
 Helmut Artzinger, CDU
 Heinrich Auge, SPD

B 
 Harri Bading, SPD
 Fritz Baier, CDU
 Siegfried Balke, CSU
 Bernhard Balkenhol, CDU
 Hans Bals, SPD
 Andreas Baltes, SPD (from 15 December 1967)
 Hermann Barche, SPD (from 14 April 1967)
 Hans Bardens, SPD
 Willy Bartsch, SPD
 Rainer Barzel, CDU
 Hannsheinz Bauer, SPD
 Josef Bauer, CSU
 Willi Bäuerle, SPD
 Bernhard Bauknecht, CDU
 Alfons Bayerl, SPD (from 27 October 1967)
 Helmut Bazille, SPD
 Walter Becher, CSU (GDP)
 Karl Bechert, SPD
 Josef Becker, CDU
 Walter Behrendt, SPD
 Ernst Benda, CDU
 August Berberich, CDU
 Fritz Berendsen, CDU
 Urich Berger, CDU
 Margarete Berger-Heise, SPD
 Karl Bergmann, SPD
 Karl Wilhelm Berkhan, SPD
 August Berlin, SPD
 Anton Besold, CSU
 Willi Beuster, SPD
 Karl Bewerunge, CDU
 Hermann Biechele, CDU
 Günter Biermann, SPD
 Kurt Birrenbach, CDU
 Peter Blachstein, SPD (until 31 May 1968)
 Theodor Blank, CDU
 Hans Blöcker, CDU
 Irma Blohm, CDU
 Friedrich Blume, SPD
 Erik Blumenfeld, CDU
 Fritz Böhm, SPD
 William Borm, FDP
 Holger Börner, SPD
 Peter Wilhelm Brand, CDU
 Aenne Brauksiepe, CDU
 Josef Braun, SPD (until 17 July 1966)
 Rolf Bremer, CDU
 Heinz Brenck, CSU
 Wilhelm Brese, CDU
 Alwin Brück, SPD
 Valentin Brück, CDU
 Eberhard Brünen, SPD
 Ewald Bucher, FDP
 Werner Buchstaller, SPD
 Heinz Budde, CDU
 Karl August Bühler, CDU
 Reinhard Bühling, SPD
 Fritz Burgbacher, CDU
 Alfred Burgemeister, CDU
 Albert Burger, CDU
 Hermann Buschfort, SPD
 Hermann Busse, FDP
 Fritz Büttner, SPD

C 
 Hugo Collet, SPD
 Hermann Conring, CDU
 Fritz Corterier, SPD
 Johann Cramer, SPD
 Herbert Czaja, CDU

D 
 Rolf Dahlgrün, FDP
 Carl Damm, CDU
 Thomas Dehler, FDP (until 21 July 1967)
 Rembert van Delden, CDU
 Arved Deringer, CDU
 Hans Dichgans, CDU
 Hermann Diebäcker, CDU
 Bruno Diekmann, SPD
 Emmy Diemer-Nicolaus, FDP
 Stefan Dittrich, CSU
 Werner Dollinger, CSU
 Wolfram Dorn, FDP
 Hermann Dortans, SPD (from 30 June 1969)
 Heinrich Draeger, CDU
 Wilhelm Dröscher, SPD

E 
 Felix von Eckardt, CDU
 Günther Eckerland, SPD
 Walter Eckhardt, CSU
 Josef Effertz, FDP (until 4 July 1968)
 Georg Ehnes, CSU
 Elfriede Eilers, SPD
 Otto Eisenmann, FDP (until 1 June 1967)
 Alexander Elbrächter, CDU
 Ilse Elsner, SPD
 Hans Georg Emde, FDP
 Wendelin Enders, SPD (from 9 May 1967)
 Arthur Enk, CDU
 Elisabeth Enseling, CDU (from 28 April 1966)
 Erhard Eppler, SPD
 Benno Erhard, CDU
 Ludwig Erhard, CDU
 Fritz Erler, SPD (until 22 February 1967)
 Leo Ernesti, CDU (from 9 July 1967)
 Ferdinand Erpenbeck, CDU
 Josef Ertl, FDP
 Fritz Eschmann, SPD
 Helmut Esters, SPD (from 15 January 1969)
 Bert Even, CDU
 Karl-Heinz Exner, CDU

F 
 Franz Falke, CDU (from 27 July 1967)
 Walter Faller, SPD
 Josef Felder, SPD
 Ludwig FellerMayer, SPD
 Adolf Feuring, SPD (from 2 January 1967)
 Werner Figgen, SPD (until 6 December 1966)
 Gerhard Flämig, SPD
 Erwin Folger, SPD
 Egon Franke, SPD
 Heinrich Franke, CDU
 Ludwig Franz, CSU
 Jakob Franzen, CDU
 Günter Frede, SPD (until 23 November 1967)
 Heinz Frehsee, SPD
 Friedrich Freiwald, CDU
 Göke Frerichs, CDU
 Martin Frey, CDU
 Brigitte Freyh, SPD
 Hans Friderichs, FDP
 Heinz Frieler, CDU
 Walter Fritsch, SPD
 Friedrich Fritz, CDU
 Karl-Walter Fritz, SPD
 Liselotte Funcke, FDP
 Hans Furler, CDU

G 
 Hans Geiger, SPD
 Ingeborg Geisendörfer, CSU
 Franz Xaver Geisenhofer, CSU (from 3 May 1967)
 Heiner Geißler, CDU (until 11 October 1967)
 Karl Geldner, FDP
 Gustav Freiherr von Gemmingen-Hornberg, FDP (from 11 October 1967)
 Hans-Dietrich Genscher, FDP
 Horst Gerlach, SPD
 Eugen Gerstenmaier, CDU
 Hans Gertzen, SPD
 Heinrich Gewandt, CDU
 Paul Gibbert, CDU (until 30 December 1967)
 Karl Heinz Gierenstein, CSU
 Udo Giulini, CDU
 Franz Gleissner, CSU
 Eugen Glombig, SPD
 Hermann Glüsing, CDU
 Leo Gottesleben, CDU
 Hermann Götz, CDU
 Carlo Graaff, FDP
 Johann Baptist Gradl, CDU
 Annemarie Griesinger, CDU
 Kurt Gscheidle, SPD
 Max Güde, CDU
 Karl Theodor Freiherr von und zu Guttenberg, CSU

H 
 Hermann Haage, SPD
 Ernst Haar, SPD
 Albrecht Haas, FDP
 Detlef Haase, SPD
 Lothar Haase, CDU
 Karl Haehser, SPD
 Hansjörg Häfele, CDU
 Karl Hahn, CDU
 Heinrich Hamacher, SPD
 Ludwig Hamm, FDP (until 12 May 1966)
 Hugo Hammans, CDU
 Hermann Hansing, SPD
 August Hanz, CDU
 Kurt Härzschel, CDU (from 19 October 1967)
 Kai-Uwe von Hassel, CDU
 Rudolf Hauck, SPD
 Herbert Hauffe, SPD
 Alo Hauser, CDU
 Hugo Hauser, CDU
 Erwin Häussler, CDU
 Bruno Heck, CDU
 Udo Hein, SPD (until 22 December 1966)
 Gustav Heinemann, SPD (until 24 June 1969)
 Josef Hellenbrock, SPD
 Walther Hellige, FDP
 Hermann Herberts, SPD
 Luise Herklotz, SPD
 Hans Hermsdorf, SPD
 Karl Herold, SPD
 Carl Hesberg, CDU
 Hedda Heuser, FDP (from 11 July 1968)
 Anton Hilbert, CDU
 Martin Hirsch, SPD
 Hermann Höcherl, CSU
 Josef Hofmann, CDU
 Karl Hofmann, SPD
 Egon Höhmann, SPD
 Franz Höhne, SPD
 Heinrich Holkenbrink, CDU (until 17 July 1967)
 Ernst Hölzle, SPD (from 20 February 1967)
 Lieselotte Holzmeister, CDU (from 5 February 1968)
 Fritz Wilhelm Hörauf, SPD
 Hans Hörmann, SPD
 Heinrich Hörnemann, CDU
 Martin Horstmeier, CDU
 Alphons Horten, CDU
 Alex Hösl, CSU
 Elinor Hubert, SPD
 Klaus Hübner, SPD (from 6 December 1966 until 14 January 1969)
 Adalbert Hudak, CSU
 Josef Hufnagel, SPD
 Rudolf Hussong, SPD (until 10 December 1967)
 Lambert Huys, CDU

I 
 Joseph Illerhaus, CDU
 Hans Ils, SPD
 Wolfgang Imle, FDP (from 2 June 1967)
 Hans Iven, SPD

J 
 Maria Jacobi, CDU
 Werner Jacobi, SPD
 Richard Jaeger, CSU
 Hans Edgar Jahn, CDU
 Gerhard Jahn, SPD
 Wenzel Jaksch, SPD (until 27 November 1966)
 Günter Jaschke, SPD
 Franz Josef Zebisch, SPD
 Johann Peter Josten, CDU
 Kurt Jung, FDP (from 17 May 1966)
 Hans-Jürgen Junghans, SPD
 Gerhard Jungmann, CDU
 Heinrich Junker, SPD
 Nikolaus Jürgensen, SPD

K 
 Rudolf Kaffka, SPD
 Georg Kahn-Ackermann, SPD
 Margot Kalinke, CDU
 Friedrich Karius, SPD (from 18 August 1969)
 Hans Katzer, CDU
 Friedrich Kempfler, CSU
 Karl-Hans Kern, SPD (from 27 February 1967)
 Walther Leisler Kiep, CDU
 Arthur Killat, SPD
 Marie-Elisabeth Klee, CDU
 Johann Klein, CDU
 Ingeborg Kleinert, SPD (from 14 December 1967)
 Egon Klepsch, CDU
 Georg Kliesing, CDU
 Hans-Jürgen Klinker, CDU
 Ludwig Knobloch, CDU (from 24 July 1967)
 Gerhard Koch, SPD
 Jakob Koenen, SPD
 Richard Kohlberger, SPD
 Willy Könen, SPD
 Hermann Kopf, CDU
 Heinrich Köppler, CDU
 Lisa Korspeter, SPD
 Karl Krammig, CDU
 Wilhelm Krampe, CDU (from 11 October 1966)
 Edith Krappe, SPD
 Konrad Kraske, CDU
 Heinz Kreutzmann, SPD (GDP)
 Herbert Kriedemann, SPD
 Ursula Krips, SPD (until 31 January 1969)
 Heinrich Krone, CDU
 Georg Krug, CSU
 Werner Kubitza, FDP
 Paul Kübler, SPD (until 9 August 1969)
 Edeltraud Kuchtner, CSU
 Knut von Kühlmann-Stumm, FDP
 Friedrich Kühn, CDU
 Alwin Kulawig, SPD
 Ernst Kuntscher, CDU
 Werner Kunze, SPD
 Georg Kurlbaum, SPD
 Lucie Kurlbaum-Beyer, SPD

L 
 Egon Lampersbach, CDU
 Erwin Lange, SPD
 Walter Langebeck, SPD
 Hans Lautenschlager, SPD
 Georg Leber, SPD
 Albert Leicht, CDU
 Ernst Lemmer, CDU
 Karl Heinz Lemmrich, CSU
 Hans Lemp, SPD (from 29 November 1967)
 Hubert Lemper, SPD
 Helmut Lenders, SPD
 Hans Lenz, FDP (until 5 October 1967)
 Carl Otto Lenz, CDU
 Aloys Lenz, CDU
 Franz Lenze, CDU
 Edmund Leukert, CSU
 Karl Liedtke, SPD
 Harry Liehr, SPD
 Heinrich Lindenberg, CDU (from 29 September 1967)
 Josef Löbbert, SPD
 Fritz Logemann, FDP
 Ulrich Lohmar, SPD
 Walter Löhr, CDU
 Dora Lösche, SPD (from 29 July 1966)
 Rudi Lotze, SPD
 Paul Lücke, CDU
 Hans August Lücker, CSU
 Manfred Luda, CDU

M 
 Ernst Majonica, CDU
 Werner Marquardt, SPD
 Berthold Martin, CDU
 Werner Marx, CDU
 Franz Marx, SPD
 Kurt Matthes, SPD
 Hans Matthöfer, SPD
 Kurt Mattick, SPD
 Eugen Maucher, CDU
 Adolf Mauk, FDP
 Agnes Katharina Maxsein, CDU
 Wilhelm Maybaum, SPD
 Hedwig Meermann, SPD
 Rolf Meinecke, SPD
 Hans Meis, CDU
 Siegfried Meister, CDU
 Linus Memmel, CSU
 Erich Mende, FDP
 Theodor Mengelkamp, CDU (until 21 July 1967)
 Alexander Menne, FDP
 Hans-Joachim von Merkatz, CDU
 Hans Merten, SPD (until 12 December 1967)
 Werner Mertes, FDP
 Ludwig Metzger, SPD
 Wilhelm Michels, SPD
 Josef Mick, CDU
 Herwart Miessner, FDP
 Wolfgang Mischnick, FDP
 Artur Missbach, CDU
 Karl Moersch, FDP
 Alex Möller, SPD
 Karl Mommer, SPD
 Anna Mönikes, CDU (from 12 October 1967)
 Heinz Morgenstern, SPD (until 14 September 1966)
 Bernhard Mühlhan, FDP
 Adolf Müller, CDU
 Günther Müller, SPD
 Johannes Müller, CDU
 Josef Müller, CDU
 Karl Müller, SPD
 Willi Müller, SPD
 Willy Müller, SPD
 Adolf Müller-Emmert, SPD
 Ernst Müller-Hermann, CDU
 Willi Müser, CDU
 Hans Müthling, SPD

N 
 Alfred Nann, SPD (from 17 February 1969)
 Georg Neemann, SPD
 Peter Nellen, SPD
 Franz Neumann, SPD
 Paul Neumann, SPD
 Alois Niederalt, CSU
 Günter von Nordenskjöld, CDU

O 
 Alfred Ollesch, FDP
 Rudolf Opitz, FDP
 Gerhard Orgaß, CDU
 Anton Ott, CSU

P 
 Ernst Paul, SPD
 Willi Peiter, SPD (from 19 September 1967)
 Georg Peters, SPD
 Walter Peters, FDP
 Peter Petersen, CDU
 Gerhard Philipp, CDU (until 20 April 1966)
 Walter Picard, CDU
 Liselotte Pieser, CDU (from 26 June 1968)
 Elisabeth Pitz-Savelsberg, CDU
 Wolfgang Pohle, CSU
 Heinz Pöhler, SPD
 Werner Porsch, FDP (from 27 July 1967)
 Josef Porten, CDU
 Konrad Porzner, SPD
 Helmut Prassler, CDU
 Ludwig Preiß, CDU
 Konstantin Prinz von Bayern, CSU (until 30 July 1969)
 Maria Probst, CSU (until 1 May 1967)
 Herbert Prochazka, CSU (GDP)

R 
 Joachim Raffert, SPD
 Alois Rainer, CSU
 Egon Wilhelm Ramms, FDP
 Will Rasner, CDU
 Friedrich Rau, SPD
 Karl Ravens, SPD
 Wilhelm Rawe, CDU
 Karl Regling, SPD
 Reinhold Rehs, SPD
 Martin Reichmann, FDP
 Carl Reinhard, CDU
 Hermann Reinholz, CDU (from 24 July 1967)
 Gerhard Reischl, SPD
 Wilhelm Reitz, SPD
 Annemarie Renger, SPD
 Hans Richarts, CDU (until 16 September 1969)
 Klaus Richter, SPD
 Clemens Riedel, CDU
 Karl Riegel, SPD
 Fritz Rinderspacher, SPD
 Günter Rinsche, CDU
 Gerd Ritgen, CDU
 Burkhard Ritz, CDU
 Edelhard Rock, CDU
 Helmut Rohde, SPD
 Paul Röhner, CSU
 Dietrich Rollmann, CDU
 Josef Rommerskirchen, CDU
 Josef Rösing, CDU
 Johannes Baptist Rösler, CDU (from 24 September 1969)
 Kurt Ross, SPD (from 21 September 1966)
 Margarete Rudoll, SPD
 Thomas Ruf, CDU
 Hermann Josef Russe, CDU
 Wolfgang Rutschke, FDP

S 
 Hermann Saam, FDP
 Heinrich Sander, FDP
 Fritz Sänger, SPD
 Karl-Heinz Saxowski, SPD
 Botho Prinz zu Sayn-Wittgenstein-Hohenstein, CDU
 Friedrich Schäfer, SPD (until 14 February 1967)
 Marta Schanzenbach, SPD
 Walter Scheel, FDP
 Ernst Schellenberg, SPD
 Karl Schiller, SPD
 Hildegard Schimschok, SPD
 Manfred Schlager, CSU
 Albrecht Schlee, CSU
 Helmut Schlüter, SPD (until 7 April 1967)
 Carlo Schmid, SPD
 Klaus Schmid-Burgk, CDU
 Peter Schmidhuber, CSU
 Hansheinrich Schmidt, FDP
 Helmut Schmidt, SPD
 Hermann Schmidt, SPD
 Horst Schmidt, SPD
 Martin Schmidt, SPD
 Otto Schmidt, CDU
 Walter Schmidt, SPD
 Josef Schmitt, CDU
 Hermann Schmitt-Vockenhausen, SPD
 Kurt Schmücker, CDU
 Kurt Schober, CDU
 Erwin Schoettle, SPD
 Friedrich Schonhofen, SPD
 Gerhard Schröder, CDU
 Heinrich Schröder, CDU
 Christa Schroeder, CDU
 Georg Schulhoff, CDU
 Manfred Schulte, SPD
 Fritz-Rudolf Schultz, FDP
 Klaus-Peter Schulz, SPD
 Max Schulze-Vorberg, CSU
 Wolfgang Schwabe, SPD
 Elisabeth Schwarzhaupt, CDU
 Hermann Schwörer, CDU
 Hans-Christoph Seebohm, CDU (until 17 September 1967)
 Philipp Seibert, SPD
 Max Seidel, SPD
 Hans Stefan Seifriz, SPD
 Max Seither, SPD
 Elfriede Seppi, SPD
 Günther Serres, CDU
 Walter Seuffert, SPD (until 18 October 1967)
 Franz Seume, SPD
 Hellmut Sieglerschmidt, SPD (from 4 June 1969)
 J Hermann Siemer, CDU
 Edmund Sinn, CDU
 Josef Spies, CSU (from 4 August 1969)
 Hermann Spillecke, SPD
 Kurt Spitzmüller, FDP
 Gerd Springorum, CDU
 Hermann Stahlberg, CDU
 Wolfgang Stammberger, SPD
 Hans-Werner Staratzke, FDP
 Anton Stark, CDU
 Heinz Starke, FDP
 Josef Stecker, CDU
 Franz Stein, SPD (until 14 September 1967)
 Gustav Stein, CDU
 Fritz Steinhoff, SPD
 Willy Steinmetz, CDU
 Heinrich Stephan, SPD
 Georg Stiller, CSU
 Josef Stingl, CDU (until 15 June 1968)
 Gerhard Stoltenberg, CDU
 Maria Stommel, CDU
 Heinrich Stooß, CDU
 Friedrich-Karl Storm, CDU
 Franz Josef Strauß, CSU
 Käte Strobel, SPD
 Alois Strohmayr, SPD
 Detlef Struve, CDU
 Richard Stücklen, CSU
 Adolf Süsterhenn, CDU

T 
 Harry Tallert, SPD
 Richard Tamblé, SPD
 Theodor Teriete, CDU
 Peter Tobaben, CDU
 Albert Tönjes, SPD
 Hans Toussaint, CDU

U 
 Franz Xaver Unertl, CSU
 Wilhelm Urban, SPD

V 
 Franz Varelmann, CDU
 Hans Verbeek, CDU (until 13 December 1966)
 Franz Vit, SPD
 Felix Freiherr von Vittinghoff-Schell, CDU
 Friedrich Vogel, CDU (until 6 October 1966)
 Bernhard Vogel, CDU (until 17 July 1967)
 Karl-Heinz Vogt, CSU

W 
 Gerold Wächter, FDP
 Leo Wagner, CSU
 Eduard Wahl, CDU
 Fritz Walter, FDP
 Herbert Wehner, SPD
 Franz Weigl, CSU
 Erich Weiland, CDU (from 14 December 1966)
 August Weimer, CDU
 Erwin Welke, SPD
 Hans Wellmann, SPD (until 30 May 1969)
 Heinrich Welslau, SPD
 Helmut Wendelborn, CDU
 Martin Wendt, SPD
 Helene Wessel, SPD (until 13 October 1969)
 Heinz Westphal, SPD
 Helga Wex, CDU (from 28 April 1967)
 Bruno Wiefel, SPD
 Karl Wienand, SPD
 Karl Wieninger, CSU
 Werner Wilhelm, SPD
 Hans Wilhelmi, CDU
 Heinrich Wilper, CDU (until 3 July 1967)
 Heinrich Windelen, CDU
 Bernhard Winkelheide, CDU
 Hans-Jürgen Wischnewski, SPD
 Erika Wolf, CDU
 Willi Wolf, SPD
 Manfred Wörner, CDU
 Olaf Baron von Wrangel, CDU
 Franz-Josef Wuermeling, CDU
 Heinrich Wullenhaupt, CDU
 Richard Wurbs, FDP
 Johann Wuwer, SPD

Z 
 Edwin Zerbe, SPD (until 2 May 1967)
 Erich Ziegler, CSU
 Friedrich Zimmermann, CSU (until 15 October 1969)
 Otto Zink, CDU
 Siegfried Zoglmann, FDP

See also 
 Politics of Germany
 List of Bundestag Members

05